Nutter Fork is a stream in the U.S. state of West Virginia.

The community was named after one Mr. Nutter, a pioneer who settled there.

See also
List of rivers of West Virginia

References

Rivers of Doddridge County, West Virginia
Rivers of West Virginia